Ursula Hamenstädt (born 15 January 1961) is a German mathematician who works as a professor at the University of Bonn. Her primary research subject is differential geometry.

Education and career 
Hamenstädt earned her PhD from the University of Bonn in 1986, under the supervision of Wilhelm Klingenberg.
Her dissertation, Zur Theorie der Carnot-Caratheodory Metriken und ihren Anwendungen [The theory of Carnot–Caratheodory metrics and their applications], concerned the theory of sub-Riemannian manifolds.

After completing her doctorate, she became a Miller Research Fellow at the University of California, Berkeley and then an assistant professor at the California Institute of Technology before returning to Bonn as a faculty member in 1990.

Honors 
Hamenstädt was an invited speaker at the International Congress of Mathematicians in 2010. In 2012 she was elected to the German Academy of Sciences Leopoldina, and in the same year she became one of the inaugural fellows of the American Mathematical Society.
She was the Emmy Noether Lecturer of the German Mathematical Society in 2017.

Selected publications

References

External links
Home page

1961 births
Living people
German women mathematicians
California Institute of Technology faculty
Academic staff of the University of Bonn
Fellows of the American Mathematical Society
University of Bonn alumni
20th-century German mathematicians
21st-century German mathematicians
Differential geometers
20th-century women mathematicians
21st-century women mathematicians
20th-century German women
21st-century German women